The Bandim Health Project works with population based health research in one of the world's poorest countries, Guinea-Bissau in West Africa.

The core of the project is a health and demographic surveillance system which registers more than 100,000 people in six suburbs of the capital Bissau. Furthermore, 182 representative clusters of 100 women and their children are followed in the rural areas. Information on health, diseases, immunisations, breast-feeding, etc. is collected, primarily focusing on women and children. Admissions to the country's sole pediatric ward in the capital are recorded.

The Bandim Health Project is member of the INDEPTH Network of health and demographic surveillance sites in Africa, Asia and Oceania.

History
The Bandim Health Project was initiated in 1978 by Peter Aaby. The project is currently based on collaboration between the Ministry of Public Health in Guinea-Bissau, the Statens Serum Institut in Denmark, and researchers affiliated to The University of Southern Denmark, as well as the University of Aarhus, Denmark.

In 2012, the Danish National Research Foundation funded the establishment of the Center of Excellence, The Research Center for Vitamins and Vaccines (CVIVA) based on the Bandim Health Project and its research into non-specific effects of vaccines.

Fields of research
The Bandim Health Project works with population based health research, focusing on women and children. The project's fields of research include:
 Vaccines, both their specific effects on the targeted diseases, and in particular their potential non-specific effects on morbidity and mortality.
 Other health interventions, including assessment of the total impact on mortality of new interventions or changes in existing policies.
 Infectious diseases, e.g. measles, diarrhoea, rotavirus, respiratory infections, malaria, HIV, HTLV, and Tuberculosis.
 Nutrition, including micronutrients such as vitamin A supplementation, and breast-feeding.
 Humanitarian aid.

Important results
One of the most important findings was that a new measles vaccine used in low-income countries was associated with a two-fold increase in mortality among girls. This discovery led to the withdrawal of the vaccine. Had it not been withdrawn, it could have cost at least ½ million additional female deaths per year in Africa alone.

The organization
The Bandim Health Project is led by Peter Aaby. The National Research Coordinator is Amabelia Rodrigues. Since the project's foundation in 1978, more than 700 scientific articles have been published, and more than 40 PhD or doctoral degrees and 13 Masters of International Health degrees have been obtained by researchers employed by the project.

Affiliations
Bandim Health Project is placed in Guinea-Bissau and also has a small department at Statens Serum Institut in Denmark. Bandim Health Project is also affiliated with University of Southern Denmark, where Peter Aaby is an adjunct professor and Christine Benn holds a professorship in Global Health.

See also
 Non-specific effect of vaccines
 Statens Serum Institut
 Guinea-Bissau
 Peter Aaby

References

External links
 Official website
 Research Center for Vitamins and Vaccines
 Statens Serum Institut

Medical and health organizations based in Denmark
Medical and health organisations based in Guinea-Bissau
Medical research institutes
Public health research